Dokk1 station is a tram stop serving the central part of the city of Aarhus in Jutland, Denmark. The station is located on the Aarhus light rail, on the Grenaa Line between Aarhus and Grenaa. The station was called Europaplads until it was temporarily closed in 2016 to 2017, then renamed to Dokk1 station, and redefined to a tram stop, a part of the Aarhus light rail system. It is named after the Dokk1 culture centre.

References

External links

 Banedanmark
 Aarhus Letbane

Railway stations in Aarhus